Devon Preparatory School is a Catholic all-male college preparatory school in Devon, Pennsylvania, in the United States, founded in 1956 by Piarists. It is divided into a middle school (grades 6–8) and an upper school (grades 9–12), both located on the same  campus. The school operates independently under the auspices of the Roman Catholic Archdiocese of Philadelphia.

History
The Devon Preparatory School site was originally owned by Philadelphia publisher, art collector, and socialite Charles Matthew Lea, who built his mansion in 1913 that was later to become Calasanctus Hall. Lea, son of historian Henry Charles Lea, inherited his fortune from the Lea & Febiger publishing firm, the oldest publishing company in the United States (1785–1990). The firm's best-known title was the American edition of Gray's Anatomy, which they began publishing in 1859. In 1920, the school expanded the original  tract on the east side of Valley Forge Road by purchasing an additional . This consolidated property was known as Westthorpe Farm.

The main entrance to Westthorpe Farm was at the intersection of Conestoga Road, Valley Forge Road, and Hunters Lane, where large stone pillars still stand. Several stone pillars that initially formed a southern fence line remain partially in place along West Conestoga and Upper Gulph Roads. The current entrance to Devon Preparatory School, on Valley Forge Road, was the service entrance to the mansion. An outbuilding from Westthorpe Farm still stands northeast of the intersection of Upper Gulph and Hunters Lane.

The 25-room Westthorpe mansion, designed by Brockie & Hastings, was the home of Charles M. Lea until he died in 1927. His widow, Charlotte Augusta Lea, remained at the mansion until she died in 1945.

The property was then sold to Alexander Shand, a developer who built one of the first post-World War II developments of homes known as the Shand Tract on Steeplechase Road and Hunters Lane. Shand sold the mansion to Joseph Lerner, who had hoped to make it a psychiatric hospital. Because of neighborhood opposition to his project, Lerner sold the property to the Piarist Fathers in 1955.

Admissions

Demographics

Extracurricular activities

Athletics
Devon Prep's athletic teams compete in the Philadelphia Catholic League (12 teams).

Fall: Cross Country, Soccer (Varsity, Junior Varsity, and Freshmen), Golf (Varsity and Junior Varsity), and Crew.
Winter: Basketball (Varsity, Junior Varsity, and Freshmen), Indoor Track, Bowling, Squash, Ice Hockey, and Swimming.
Spring: Baseball (Varsity and Junior Varsity), Lacrosse, Track and Field, Tennis, and Crew.

PIAA Championships 
Devon Prep has won multiple championships, which include the following:

 Golf:
 2022 PIAA 2A INDIVIDUAL GOLF CHAMPION - Nick Ciocca
 2021 PIAA 2A GOLF CHAMPIONs - Team (Graham White, Tyler Kenneson, Kidder Urban, Nick Ciocca, Charlie Hurchalla, Patrick Duffy)
 Basketball:
 2022 PIAA 3A BASKETBALL PIAA CHAMPIONS
 Baseball:
 2014 PIAA 1A BASEBALL CHAMPIONS
 2019 PIAA 2A BASEBALL CHAMPIONS
 Tennis:
 2021 2A PIAA DOUBLES CHAMPIONS - Evan Bramlage and Ryan Bill

Clubs and activities
Devon Prep has over 50 different extracurricular activity groups. Some of them include: Mock Trial, Model United Nations, Science Olympiad, Film Club, Devon Dialogue (newspaper), Calasanctian (yearbook), Art Club, and many more.  There is an elected Student Council, honor societies, and an Academic Challenge Team. Musical groups for students include Jazz Band, Rock Band, Choral Tide, and Rip Tide. 
There is an annual Fall Drama and Spring Musical.

Summer enrichment program
In the summer, Devon Prep hosts a Summer Enrichment Program. Students participate in sports and dramatic arts camps and various other courses throughout the two sessions. They attend classes including algebra readiness, digital photography, painting and sculpting, video production, study skills, web building, and history explorations. The sports camps include baseball, soccer, track, golf, and basketball.

Notable alumni
Raymond Geuss, philosopher, professor at Cambridge University
Mark Malseed, co-author, The Google Story and a named collaborator, with author Bob Woodward, on the #1 New York Times non-fiction bestsellers Plan of Attack and Bush at War.

See also
Piarists
St. Joseph Calasanz – founder of the Pious Schools and the Order of the Piarists
List of high schools in Pennsylvania

References

External links
Official website

Boys' schools in the United States
Piarist Order
Private middle schools in Pennsylvania
Catholic secondary schools in Pennsylvania
Catholic elementary schools in Pennsylvania
Educational institutions established in 1956
Schools in Chester County, Pennsylvania
1956 establishments in Pennsylvania